The 2021 Bluegreen Vacations Duels were a pair of NASCAR Cup Series stock car races held on February 11, 2021, at Daytona International Speedway in Daytona Beach, Florida. Both contested over 60 laps, they were the qualifying races for the 2021 Daytona 500.

Report

Background

Daytona International Speedway is one of six superspeedways to hold NASCAR races, the others being Michigan International Speedway, Auto Club Speedway, Indianapolis Motor Speedway, Pocono Raceway and Talladega Superspeedway. The track's turns are banked at 31 degrees, while the front stretch, the location of the finish line, is banked at 18 degrees.

Qualifying

Qualifying results

Duels

Duel 1

Duel 1 results

NOTE:  Points in italics are owner points only.  The driver is ineligible because he declared points in another national series.  Owner points, not driver points, will be used by NASCAR in calculating points for purposes of setting fields for the majority of Cup Series races in 2021.

Duel 2

Duel 2 results

Media

Television

Radio

References

Bluegreen Vacations Duels
Bluegreen Vacations Duels
Bluegreen Vacations Duels
NASCAR races at Daytona International Speedway